Carn is a magazine produced by the Celtic League.

Carn may also refer to:

Places
 Carn, Conry, a townland in Conry civil parish, barony of Rathconrath, County Westmeath, Republic of Ireland
 Carn, County Fermanagh, a townland in County Fermanagh, Northern Ireland
 Carn, County Londonderry, a townland in County Londonderry, Northern Ireland
 Carn, Foyran, a townland in Foyran civil parish, barony of Fore, County Westmeath, Republic of Ireland
 Carn (Magheraculmoney), a townland in County Fermanagh, Northern Ireland
 Carn, Mayne, a townland in Mayne civil parish, barony of Fore, County Westmeath, Republic of Ireland
 Carn, Tullyhunco, a townland in Kildallan civil parish, barony of Tullyhunco, County Cavan, Republic of Ireland

Other uses
 CKFG-FM, a radio station in Toronto, Ontario, Canada branded as "Caribbean African Radio Network", or CARN
Carn (hill), a classification of Irish hills
 Carn: the name for a granite outcrop on the top of hills in (mostly) west Cornwall; in east Cornwall and on Dartmoor the granite outcrops are known as Tors

See also

Cari (disambiguation)
 Carns, a surname